Mandarina luhuana is an extinct species of air-breathing land snail, a terrestrial pulmonate gastropod mollusk in the family Bradybaenidae. This species is endemic to Chichi-jima and Minami-jima of the Bonin Islands in Japan.

Subspecies
 Mandarina luhuana luhuana (Sowerby, 1839)
 Mandarina luhuana minamijima Chiba, 2007

References

Molluscs of Japan
Mandarina
Taxa named by George Brettingham Sowerby I
Taxonomy articles created by Polbot